John Muldoon may refer to:

John Muldoon (rugby union, born 1896) (1896–1944), American Olympic rugby union player 
John Muldoon (rugby union, born 1982), Connacht rugby player
John Muldoon (politician) (1865–1938), Irish barrister and nationalist MP in the United Kingdom Parliament
John Muldoon (footballer) (born 1964), English footballer